Louise E. Purton is an Australian biologist who is Professor of Medicine and head of the Stem Cell Regulation Laboratory at St. Vincent's Institute of Medical Research in Melbourne. Her research considers the stem cells responsible for the production of blood cells and the regulations of haematopoietic diseases. She was awarded the International Society for Experimental Hematology McCulloch & Till Award in 2022.

Early life and education 
Purton was an undergraduate student at the University of Melbourne. She remained there for doctoral research, where she studied the stroll cell types in bone marrow. She moved to the United States for postdoctoral research, where she worked at the Fred Hutchinson Cancer Research Center and identified that the all-trans retinoic acid enhances the renewal of hematopoietic stem cells. She returned to Australia in 2000, when she studied the roles of various retinoic acid receptors and their roles on haematopoiesis. She showed that self-renewal is regulated by Retinoic acid receptor gamma, and loss of this receptor has intrinsic and extrinsic impacts on haematopoiesis. She returned to America in 2004, where she studied cells in the bone marrow microenvironment and how they could regulate myeloproliferative-like disorders.

Research and career 
In 2008 Purton returned to Australia, where she launched the St. Vincent's Institute of Medical Research Stem Cell Regulation Unity. She investigates the processes involved in haematopoiesis, the production of blood cells. These processes involve hematopoietic stem cells, which can either self-renew or differentiate into more mature types. Issues surrounding the regulation of hematopoietic stem cells can lead to diseases such as leukaemia. Purton investigates the roles of retinoic acid receptors in haematopoiesis. She makes use of mouse models, cell assays and gene transduction. Through these studies, she identified how blood cells are produced in bone marrow, which can impact the downstream treatment of blood cancer.

Purton has studied the role of Homeobox A1 (HOXA1) in myelodysplastic syndrome (MDS), a blood cell disease that results in bone marrow failure. Around 30% of patients with MDS progress to acute myeloid leukaemia, and the only treatment is hematopoietic stem cell transplantation. She identified that altered HOXA1 genes impact the ability of haematopoietic stem cells.

Purton was appointed Associate Editor of Experimental Hematology in 2020.

Awards and honours 
 2011 National Health and Medical Research Council Senior Research Fellowship
 2016 SVI Foundation Award
 2019 University of Melbourne Professorial Fellow
 2022 International Society for Experimental Hematology McCulloch & Till Award

Academic service 
Purton has worked to improve diversity within the scientific community. She identified and publicised inequality in the rates of funding for men and women in Australia. For example, she identified that the National Health and Medical Research Council awarded men 23% more grants ($95 million more funding) than their male counterparts. She worked with Jessica Borger to launch a petition calling for a strategic overhaul of the NHMRC funding body.

Selected publications

References

External links 

Living people
Year of birth missing (living people)
Australian biologists
University of Melbourne alumni
Australian women scientists
Stem cell researchers
Women in medicine